Verre or Verres may refer to:
Verre (restaurant), Dubai, United Arab Emirates
Valerio Verre (born 1994), Italian footballer
Verres (ca. 120 BC – 43 BC), a Roman magistrate, notorious for his misgovernment of Sicily
Verrès, town and comune in the Aosta Valley region of north-western Italy
Verres (genus), a genus of beetles in family Passalidae

See also

53W53, formerly known as Tower Verre, New York City skyscraper
Orangeside triggerfish, scientific name S. verres